Edamaruk is a village in Udumbannoor Panchayat in Thodupuzha Taluk of Idukki District, Kerala, India. The place became famous due to Joseph Edamaruku, who is the founder-president of Rationalist International.

Edamaruku- There is also a place with same name in Meenachil taluk of Kottayam district in Kerala. 

Villages in Idukki district